Hemicrepidius hemipodus is a species of click beetle belonging to the family Elateridae.

References

External links
Image of Hemicrepidius hemipodus on BugGuide

Beetles described in 1825
hemipodus